In functional analysis, compact operators are linear operators on Banach spaces that map bounded sets to relatively compact sets. In the case of a Hilbert space H, the compact operators are the closure of the finite rank operators in the uniform operator topology. In general, operators on infinite-dimensional spaces feature properties that do not appear in the finite-dimensional case, i.e. for matrices. The compact operators are notable in that they share as much similarity with matrices as one can expect from a general operator. In particular, the spectral properties of compact operators resemble those of square matrices.

This article first summarizes the corresponding results from the matrix case before discussing the spectral properties of compact operators. The reader will see that most statements transfer verbatim from the matrix case.

The spectral theory of compact operators was first developed by F. Riesz.

Spectral theory of matrices 

The classical result for square matrices is the Jordan canonical form, which states the following:

Theorem. Let A be an n × n complex matrix, i.e. A a linear operator acting on Cn. If λ1...λk are the distinct eigenvalues of A, then Cn can be decomposed into the invariant subspaces of A

The subspace Yi = Ker(λi − A)m where Ker(λi − A)m = Ker(λi − A)m+1. Furthermore,  the poles of the resolvent function ζ → (ζ − A)−1 coincide with the set of eigenvalues of A.

Compact operators

Statement

Proof 

Preliminary Lemmas

The theorem claims several properties of the operator λ − C where λ ≠ 0. 
Without loss of generality, it can be assumed that λ = 1. 
Therefore we consider I − C, I being the identity operator. The proof will require two lemmas.

This fact will be used repeatedly in the argument leading to the theorem. 
Notice that when X is a Hilbert space, the lemma is trivial.

Concluding the Proof

Invariant subspaces 
As in the matrix case, the above spectral properties lead to a decomposition of X into invariant subspaces of a compact operator C. Let λ ≠ 0 be an eigenvalue of C; so λ is an isolated point of σ(C). Using the holomorphic functional calculus, define the Riesz projection E(λ) by

where γ is a Jordan contour that encloses only λ from σ(C). Let Y be the subspace Y = E(λ)X. C restricted to Y is a compact invertible operator with spectrum {λ}, therefore Y is finite-dimensional. Let ν be such that Ker(λ − C)ν = Ker(λ − C)ν + 1. By inspecting the Jordan form, we see that (λ − C)ν = 0 while (λ − C)ν − 1 ≠ 0. The Laurent series of the resolvent mapping centered at λ shows that

So Y = Ker(λ − C)ν.

The E(λ) satisfy E(λ)2 = E(λ), so that they are indeed projection operators or spectral projections. By definition they commute with C. Moreover E(λ)E(μ) = 0 if λ ≠ μ.

 Let X(λ) = E(λ)X if λ is a non-zero eigenvalue. Thus X(λ) is a finite-dimensional invariant subspace, the generalised eigenspace of λ.
 Let X(0) be the intersection of the kernels of the E(λ). Thus X(0) is a closed subspace invariant under C and the restriction of C to X(0) is a compact operator with spectrum {0}.

Operators with compact power 
If B is an operator on a Banach space X such that Bn is compact for some n, then the theorem proven above also holds for B.

See also 
 Spectral theorem
 Spectral theory of normal C*-algebras

References

 John B. Conway, A course in functional analysis, Graduate Texts in Mathematics 96, Springer 1990. 

Functional analysis
Spectral theory
Linear operators